Domingo Zapata is a Spanish artist, writer, and fashion designer. He became a full-time artist in 2002 and sold his first major painting to George Soros in 2005. In 2017, he launched a fashion collection at New York Fashion Week and also published his first novel, The Beautiful Dream of Life.

Early life and education
Zapata lives in Palma, Mallorca, Spain, and is ethnically from Andalusia, Spain. His father was a car painter and his mother was a tailor. In 1993, he moved to London and studied art at the Regent's University London. He then moved to Washington, D.C. where he attended American University and studied contemporary and studio art. Prior to embarking on an art career, Zapata moved to New York City in 1999 and worked in finance and, briefly, in the music industry as a chairman for IMC Records (he is credited as a co-writer on an updated version of the Los del Río song, "Macarena").

Career
In 2002, while Zapata was still working on Wall Street, he began pursuing his hobby of painting. It was at this time, one of his paintings of polo horses attracted the attention of contractor Michael Borrico. In 2004, Borrico hosted a private art show at his home that contained some of Zapata's paintings. Businessman George Soros attended that event and later purchased Zapata's Blue Horse in 2005. His work has been collected by Goldman Sachs, Leonardo DiCaprio, and Johnny Depp.
 
In 2011, Haute Living magazine commissioned Zapata to do the cover art for 24 issues of the magazine. In 2012, Zapata appeared in tabloid headlines after loaning his Porsche to friend Lindsay Lohan, who was accused of clipping a pedestrian in it. That year, he also created a 35-by-15-foot mural for the Wynwood Walls in Miami. Also that year, Polaroids of Lohan that he took and then painted over were sold to a British collector for $100,000 USD. The work is a part of his series Ten, for which Kim Kardashian, Sofía Vergara, and Michelle Rodriguez have also modeled. In 2013, 30 of his works were displayed for the Venice Biennale at the Palazzo da Mula. Many of the paintings exhibited were part of Zapata's Mona Lisa series, a collection of pieces featuring Leonardo da Vinci's Mona Lisa in various "disguises." In July 2014, Zapata's painting of the crucifixion of Jesus was put on display at the Palma Cathedral. In 2014, he was commissioned to create a 25-by-10-foot American flag for the lobby of One World Trade Center in Manhattan. His five-foot-long steel shark is featured in the lobby of the United Nations headquarters in New York City.
 
In 2015, he entered into a licensing agreement with clothing company Alice + Olivia, and collaborated with the footwear brand Superga. Zapata's Superga shoe collection featured 11 styles based on his original paintings. In December of that year, the Cha Cha art gallery in Aspen, Colorado, opened as a collaboration between Zapata and Charlotte Lena to showcase Zapata's work.
 
In 2016, Zapata announced that he had sold a novel to Gallery Books, an imprint of Simon & Schuster. The semi-autobiographical novel, The Beautiful Dream of Life, was published in July 2017. In February 2017, Zapata unveiled a clothing collection at New York Fashion Week based on his artwork. He also organized other shows at New York Fashion Week and Los Angeles Fashion Week in 2018. The New York Post described Zapata as the "new Andy Warhol, with starlets begging for a sitting." His collaboration with Alice + Olivia and the CFDA, A + O X DOMINGO ZAPATA, furthered the fusion between his art and fashion.

In the summer of 2019, Zapata painted the largest vinyl mural in the history of New York City, in Times Square, on the East, West and South facades of the One Times Square building. On each of these three facades, it wrapped 15 stories in length and 300 feet in height, covering a total area of 30,000 square feet in total painted surface. The motifs used by Zapata for this work included a retrospective of his prior work including Polo Players, Pandas, Flamenco dancers and Flowers, all influenced by his native Spain and time spent living in New York City. It was created by a team of 25 people, working with Zapata for more than 3 weeks to complete his work with scaffolding suspension holding the crew over 200–400 feet above NYC during the installation and painting. It was maintained and featured in Times Square through the summer of 2020. It was partially painted, and partially printed on vinyl. After it was taken down, it was cut into 6-by-6-foot squares and donated to charities in support of art education.

Zapata has had multiple audiences with Pope Francis, and many of the meetings produced artistic collaborations. The initial meeting in 2019 was a celebration of immigrants and Zapata remarked, "I'm a citizen of the world and a constant immigrant, and I come from a humble background. The subject of immigration, therefore, is important to me. Especially in an age where people want to build walls between countries. I disagree with this thinking and I want to raise the issue and make a point out of it." This meeting led to Zapata being named an ambassador for Pointifical Scholas Occurrentes Foundation. The initial artistic collaboration between the Pope and Zapata was auctioned for $500,000 US in benefit to the Schools Occurrentes charity. 

At UNICEF's annual charity auction in St. Barts in 2021, Zapata's painting Mona Lisa bullfighter sold for more than $1 million USD, to an unnamed American collector. In 2021, Zapata and actor Jordi Mollà participated in the documentary The Private Lives of Jordi Mollà & Domingo Zapata, directed by Giuseppe Ferlito and produced by the English production house Publikro London.

In March 2022, Zapata was chosen by Louvre and Grand Palais Immersif curators as one of the artists, along with Picasso, Dalí, Basquiat, and Warhol, to be exhibited at a new immersive exhibition in the Palacio de la Bolsa in Marseille, France. Joconde: Exposition Immersive explores Leonardo da Vinci's painting Mona Lisa.

Style and Persona
Zapata has been referred to as the "next Andy Warhol" for both his pop art sensibilities and his celebrity lifestyle. He has also been described as a neo-expressionist because of his use of bright colors and his "visceral," "graffiti-like" painting method. Zapata has noted that he uses color to evoke and represent emotion (usually happiness). Many of his works explore thematic elements such as "sexuality, opulence, and vitality," often incorporating text into the artwork. Zapata often creates different series based on a single theme. These include his Polo series, Matador series, Ten series (portraits of "iconic" women), Mona Lisa series, and Panda series.

References

External links
Official website

Living people
Year of birth missing (living people)
American University alumni
Spanish artists
Spanish writers
Spanish fashion designers